Mathematics and the Imagination is a book published in New York by Simon & Schuster in 1940. The authors are Edward Kasner and James R. Newman. The illustrator Rufus Isaacs provided 169 figures. It rapidly became a best-seller and received several glowing reviews. Special publicity has been awarded it since it introduced the term googol for 10100, and googolplex for 10googol. The book includes nine chapters, an annotated bibliography of 45 titles, and an index in its 380 pages.

Reviews
According to I. Bernard Cohen, "it is the best account of modern mathematics that we have", and is "written in a graceful style, combining clarity of exposition with good humor".
According to T. A. Ryan's review, the book "is not as superficial as one might expect a book at the popular level to be. For instance, the description of the invention of the term googol ... is a very serious attempt to show how misused is the term infinite when applied to large and finite numbers."
By 1941 G. Waldo Dunnington could note the book had become a best-seller. "Apparently it has succeeded in communicating to the layman something of the pleasure experienced by the creative mathematician in difficult problem solving."

Contents
The introduction notes (p xiii) "Science, particularly mathematics, ... appears to be building the one permanent and stable edifice in an age where all others are either crumbling or being blown to bits."
The authors affirm (p xiv) "It has been our aim, ... to show by its very diversity something of the character of mathematics, of its bold, untrammelled spirit, of how, both as an art and science, it has continued to lead the creative faculties beyond even imagination and intuition."

In chapter one, "New names for old", they explain why mathematics is the science that uses easy words for hard ideas. They note (p 5) "many amusing ambiguities arise. For instance, the word function probably expresses the most important idea in the whole history of mathematics. Also, the theory of rings is much more recent than the theory of groups. It is found in most of the new books on algebra, and has nothing to do with either matrimony or bells. Page 7 introduces the Jordan curve theorem. In discussing the Problem of Apollonius, they mention that Edmond Laguerre's solution considered circles with orientation.(p 13) In presenting radicals, they say "The symbol for radical is not the hammer and sickle, but a sign three or four centuries old, and the idea of a mathematical radical is even older than that." (p 16) "Ruffini and Abel showed that equations of the fifth degree could not be solved by radicals." (p 17) (Abel–Ruffini theorem)

Chapter 2 "Beyond Googol" treats infinite sets. The distinction is made between a countable set and an uncountable set. Further, the characteristic property of infinite sets is given: an infinite class may be in 1:1 correspondence with a proper subset (p 57), so that "an infinite class is no greater than some of its parts" (p 43). In addition to introducing Aleph numbers the authors cite Lewis Carrol's The Hunting of the Snark, where instructions are given to avoid boojums when snark hunting. They say "The infinite may be boojum too." (p 61)

Chapter 3 is "Pie (i, e) Transcendental and Imaginary". To motivate e (mathematical constant), they discuss first compound interest and then continuous compounding. "No other mathematical constant, not even , is more closely connected with human affairs" (p 86).
"[e] has played an integral part in helping mathematicians describe and predict what is for man the most important of all natural phenomena – that of growth."
The exponential function, y = ex ... "is the only function of x with the rate of change with respect to x equal to the function itself." (p 87) 
The authors define the Gauss plane and describe the action of multiplication by i as rotation through 90°. They address Euler's identity, i.e. the expression e i + 1 = 0, indicating that the venerable Benjamin Peirce called it "absolutely paradoxical".
A note of idealism is then expressed: "When there is so much humility and so much vision everywhere, society will be governed by science and not its clever people." (pp 103,4)

Chapter 4 is "Assorted Geometries, Plane and Fancy". Both Non-Euclidean geometry and four-dimensional space are discussed. The authors say (p 112) "Among our most cherished convictions, none is more precious than our beliefs about space and time, yet is more difficult to explain."

In the final pages the authors approach the question, "What is mathematics?" They say it is a "sad fact that it is easier to be clever than clear." The answer is not as easy as defining biology. "[I]n mathematics we have a universal language, valid, useful, intelligible everywhere in place and time ..." Finally, "Austere and imperious as logic, it is still sufficiently sensitive and flexible to meet each new need. Yet this vast edifice rests on the simplest and most primitive foundations, is wrought by imagination and logic out of a handful of childish rules." (p 358)

References
 I. Bernard Cohen (1942), Review, Isis 33(6):723–5.
 G. Waldo Dunnington (1941), Review, Mathematics Magazine 15(4):212–3.
 T.A. Ryan (1940), Review, American Mathematical Monthly 47(10):700–1.

External links
 Google Books
 Reviews:Mathematics and the Imagination from Goodreads.

1940 non-fiction books
Popular mathematics books
Simon & Schuster books